Deir es-Sultan, literally the Monastery of the Sultan, is a monastery located on the roof of the Chapel of Saint Helena, which is part of the Church of the Holy Sepulchre in Jerusalem's Old City. The Status Quo, a 250-year old understanding between religious communities, applies to the site.

History
Deir es-Sultan is one of several holy sites in the area which are contested by various Christian denominations.
The monastery is located on the roof of the Helena Chapel, an underground chapel that is part of the Church of the Holy Sepulchre complex, and has an entrance leading down to the Parvis (the Church courtyard). The monastery covers an area of 1,800 square meters.

According to the Coptic Church, Umayyad caliph Abd al-Malik ibn Marwan granted the church to the Copts, to be named as "Deir el-Malak" (Angel Monastery), which was later confirmed by Saladin, after it was confiscated by the Crusaders, to be renamed as "Deir es-Sultan". Later on, the Ethiopian monks were hosted by the Copts in 1654, as their churches in Jerusalem were acquired by the Greek and Armenian Churches due to the inability to pay taxes.

The Ottoman Sultan Abdülhamid II granted the Ethiopians the right to set up a large tent on the roof of the Holy Sepulcher to celebrate Easter.

During the Easter Vigil in the Church of the Holy Sepulcher on April 25, 1970, the Israeli government sent military forces to change the locks of the monastery to enable the Ethiopian monks to take control of it. Afterwards, the Israeli Supreme Court unanimously approved the restoration of the monastery to the Copts on March 16, 1971, yet the government refused to implement the Supreme Court ruling.

In October 2018, a Coptic priest was arrested following protests against the restoration efforts of the monastery without the Coptic Church's consent. In April 2021, "light clashes" erupted between Egyptian and Ethiopian monks, as the latter set a tent and raised the Ethiopian flag inside the monastery. The same incident was repeated a year later on 18 April 2022. In 2022, the same type of event provoked the Coptic monks to paint the flag of Egypt on the main door leading to the monastery, adjacent to the entrance to the Coptic Patriarchate of Jerusalem.

See also
Kidane Mehret Church, Jerusalem - the Ethiopian church and monastery in the New City

References

External links

Oriental Orthodox monasteries in Jerusalem
Coptic Orthodox Church in Asia
Egyptian diaspora in the Middle East
Status quo holy places
4th-century establishments in the Byzantine Empire
Ethiopian Orthodox Tewahedo churches in Jerusalem
Coptic Orthodox Churches in Jerusalem
Christian Quarter
Church of the Holy Sepulchre